Roti is a flatbread originating from the Indian subcontinent.

Roti or ROTI may also refer to:

 Roti (1942 film), an Indian Hindi-language film directed by Mehboob Khan

 Roti (1974 film), an Indian Hindi-language film directed by Manmohan Desai
 Roti (1988 film), a Pakistani Punjabi-language film directed by Idrees Khan
 Roti (album), an album by Gurdas Maan
Rate of turn indicator, a navigational instrument on a ship
 "Rôti" (Hannibal), an episode of the television series Hannibal
 Rote Island, Indonesia
 Roti languages, a group of Timoric languages
 Roti dialect, a Bajaw language dialect
 Roti, a wrap style sandwich

People with the surname
Fred Roti (1920–1999), American politician

See also
 
 Rotis